The Youth Protection program is a set of standards, guidelines and training developed by the Boy Scouts of America to eliminate opportunities for the abuse of youth members.  All adults are required to undergo a criminal background check and to complete a Youth Protection Program training before being registered as BSA leaders and they must be re-certified every 2 years. Venturing Crew leaders will complete the Venturing Leader Youth Protection training.  If a Crew is also associated with a Troop, the adult leaders must complete both Youth Protection training and Venturing Leader Youth Protection training. This is a requirement fulfilling the internet recharter process.  When properly implemented, the program also helps to protect adult leaders from any accusations of impropriety.

BSA has made the program available for use by other youth organizations, but the Boy Scouts have done the most in implementing it and have probably instructed more young people and parents in how to recognize and prevent child abuse in any venue.  The Boy Scouts of America Youth Protection Plan was cited as a resource that other youth organizations might use in the  Center For Disease Control' s publication "Preventing Child Sexual Abuse Within Youth-serving Organizations: Getting Started on Policies and Procedures"     In 2019 the program was substantially expanded to include other aspects of youth protections such as bullying, and new provisions were added related to the expansion of participation of girls in BSA programs. All BSA adults were required to complete the new training program during 2019.

Origins
In response to increasing awareness at the time about sexual abuse in society as a whole, and concerns about the potential of sexual predators using the Boy Scout program to locate victims, BSA developed the Youth Protection program in the late 1980s in conjunction with input from leading law enforcement and psychiatric experts on the subject.

In 2003, criminal background checks were required for all new leaders.  Leaders who had registered before 2003 were required to undergo background checks in 2008.

Elements of abuse
The Youth Protection program recognizes four elements for a child abuser to commit abuse. The abuser must:

 have the desire and motivation to abuse children.
 be able to overcome any of their own inhibitions.
 bypass any protections or barriers that would normally protect the child.
 overcome the child's natural resistance.

The program also recognizes that the abuser may be a male or female, adult, youth or adolescent.

Leadership selection
BSA units are chartered by a community organization such as a religious congregation, fraternal group, service club, business, or other local community group.  As part of the Youth Protection program, a criminal background check is performed on all adults when they register with the BSA.  Adults applying for unit leader positions must be approved by the unit committee chair and the chartered organization representative.

The BSA recognizes that background checks can only identify those with past histories of abuse or criminal record.  The unit leadership is expected to screen applicants for past experience and motivations of individuals that a criminal background check would not reveal.

Training requirements and 2019 expansion 

BSA adults are required to complete the youth protection training program once every two years.   In 2019 the program was substantially expanded to include other aspects of youth protection such as bullying, and new provisions were added related to the expansion of participation of girls in BSA programs. All BSA adults were required to complete the new training program during 2019.

Youth education
Youth Protection includes programs to educate youth in the "three R's": recognize, resist and report.  Youths must recognize situations that might place them at risk and must recognize the signs that someone may be an abuser.  The youth must also understand that they have the right to resist unwarranted attention and that resisting will stop most attempts.  Youth must also understand that they must report any abuse or attempts in order to prevent further abuse to themselves and others.

Training materials for this education include parent's guides included in every handbook plus videos that are shown to each unit's members once a year.  An emphasis on training is placed in April, Prevent Child Abuse Month.

The training materials for Scouts include the parent guides in each handbook, the It Happened to Me and A Time to Tell videos and the Power Pack Pals comic book series.  There are also youth protection training guides and videos for teenage girls and boys participating in the Venturing and Sea Scouting programs.

Training materials

Cub Scouts
Parents guides
It Happened to Me training video
Power Pack Pals comic book series

Boy Scouts and Varsity Scouts
Parents guides
A Time to Tell is a youth protection training video aimed at boys aged 11–14.  It teaches how to recognize, resist and report sexual abuse.

Venturers and Sea Scouts
Youth Protection: Personal Safety Awareness
" Venturing Leader Youth Protection Training"

Leaders
Youth Protection Guidelines for Adult Leaders and Parents

See also
 Boy Scouts of America sex abuse cases
 Scouting sex abuse cases

References

External links

Boy Scouts of America